Carl "C.J." Snare is an American singer best known for being the frontman and founding member of the hard rock/glam metal band FireHouse.

He co-wrote most of the band's songs and has had seven songs chart on the Billboard Hot 100 Charts, five of which were top 40. He also appears periodically with his other band, Rubicon Cross, and occasionally appears with Scrap Metal. He continues to tour with FireHouse and works as a producer and mixing engineer.

Discography

With Maxx Warrior 
 Maxx Warrior (1986)

Studio albums with FireHouse 
FireHouse – August 21, 1990 – No. 21 US
Hold Your Fire – June 16, 1992 – No. 23 US
3 – April 11, 1995 – No. 66 US
Good Acoustics – October 8, 1996
Category 5 – October 1998
O2 – November 7, 2000
Prime Time – August 12, 2003
Full Circle – June 2011

Live albums with FireHouse 
Bring 'Em Out Live – December 1999

C.J. Snare 

"Do What You Believe (Single) Liberty N Justice-Light It Up (2010)
"God Rest Ye Merry Gentlemen (Single) A Christmas Gift (2010)
"Oh Come Emmanuel (Single) A Christmas Gift (2011)
"Pride (In The Name Of Love) Liberty 'N Justice Cigar Chronicles Vol. 1 ( 2013)
" The Rest of My Life (Single) From Asia With Love (2013)

Rubicon Cross 

"Rubicon Cross – Limited Edition EP (2011)
"Rubicon Cross – Single – Locked and Loaded (2012) featured on CodeMasters "Dirt" Showdown Video Game
"Rubicon Cross – CD – Standard Version (2014) released 5/19 on INgrooves Distributed by Universal Music Group
"Rubicon Cross – Deluxe CD – (2014) Best Buy Exclusive released 5/19 on INgrooves Distributed by Universal Music Group
"Rubicon Cross – Digital Album – (2014) released 5/19 on INgrooves
"Rubicon Cross – Deluxe Japanese CD – (2014) released on King Records

Production work 
"Do What You Believe (Single) Liberty N Justice-Light It Up (2010)
"God Rest Ye Merry Gentlemen (Single) A Christmas Gift (2010)
"Oh Come Emmanuel (Single) A Christmas Gift (2011)
"Guitarcadia = Xander Demos (2012)
" Liberty 'N Justice (Various Artists) Cigar Chronicles Vol. 1 ( 2013)
"Already Ghosts = Hymn of a New Dark Age ( 2013 )
" The Rest of My Life (Single) From Asia With Love (2013)
" Rubicon Cross = Debut Album (2014) Engineering Credit

Living people
American heavy metal singers
FireHouse (band) members
Singers from Washington, D.C.
Year of birth missing (living people)